Jeannine is a given name. Notable people with the name include:

Jeannine Altmeyer (born 1948), American operatic soprano
Jeannine Baticle (1920–2014), French curator
Jeannine Burch (born 1968), Swiss television actress
Jeannine Davis-Kimball (1929–2017), American archaeologist
Jeannine Edwards (sportscaster), American sportscaster who works for ESPN
Jeannine Garside (born 1978), rising star in women's boxing
Jeannine Gramick (born 1942), Roman Catholic nun, co-founder of New Ways Ministry
Jeannine Haffner, singer and songwriter, wrote the song Yes We Can
Jeannine Hall Gailey (born 1973), American poet
Jeannine Oppewall (born 1946), American film art director
Jeannine Parvati Baker (1949–2005), Yogini, midwife, herbalist, published author, and poet
Jeannine Phillips, beauty queen from Lisbon, Connecticut; competed in Miss USA pageant
Jeannine Savard, poet from New York state
A jazz standard written by Duke Pearson with lyrics by Oscar Brown, Jr.

See also
École Active Bilingue Jeannine Manuel (EABJM) is a private school in Paris, France
Jeannine Rainbolt College of Education, the education unit of the University of Oklahoma in Norman
Jeanine
Janine (disambiguation)

de:Janine